Acanthochirana is an extinct genus of prawn that existed during the upper Jurassic period. It was named by E. Strand in 1928, and its type species is Acanthochirana cordata. They are distinguished from the related genus Aeger by the presence of teeth on the rostrum, which are absent in Aeger.

Species 
, Acanthochirana includes six to seven species:

 Acanthochirana angulata 
Acanthochirana cenomanica 
 Acanthochirana cordata 
Acanthochirana krausei 
Acanthochirana liburiansis 
Acanthochirana smithwoodwardi 
Acanthochirana triassica

Notes

References

External links
 Acanthochirana at the Paleobiology Database

Dendrobranchiata
Jurassic crustaceans
Prehistoric arthropods of Europe
Prehistoric crustacean genera